Guishan may refer to:

Mainland China 
 Guishan Guanyin of the Thousand Hands and Eyes, colossal Buddha statue in Changsha
 Guishan TV Tower, also known as Tortoise Mountain TV Tower, in Wuhan
 Dong Guishan, lieutenant general in the People's Liberation Army (PLA)
 Guishan, Guangdong, town in Xiangzhou District, Zhuhai
 Guishan, Macheng, town in Macheng, Huanggang, Hubei
 Guishan Township, Zhejiang, in Anji County
 Guishan Subdistrict, Xinping Yi and Dai Autonomous County, Yunnan

Taiwan 
 Guishan Island, island of Yilan County off the northeastern coast of Taiwan
 Guishan District, district in Taoyuan, Taiwan

People
 Guishan Lingyou (771-853 CE), a Chinese Buddhist monk of the Tang Dynasty